The following is a chronological list of Tournament of Roses Parade themes, which were chosen by the Presidents of the Tournament of Roses Association. The new theme is announced when the new president takes office in the third week of January.

Themes

20th Century
 1918 – Patriotism
 1919 – Victory Tournament
 1920-1926 – No Themes
 1927 – Songs in Flowers
 1928 – States & Nations in Flowers
 1929 – Poems in Flowers
 1930 – Festival Days in Flowers
 1931 – Dreams in Flowers
 1932 – Nations & Games in Flowers
 1933 – Fairy Tales in Flowers
 1934 – Tales of the Seven Seas
 1935 – Golden Legends
 1936 – History in Flowers
 1937 – Romance in Flowers
 1938 – Playland Fantasies
 1939 – Golden Memories
 1940 – 20th Century in Flowers
 1941 – America in Flowers
 1942 – The Americas
 1943 – We're in to Win
 1944 – Memories of the Past
 1945 – Hold a Victory so Hardly Won
 1946 – Victory, Unity and Peace
 1947 – Holidays in Flowers
 1948 – Our Golden West
 1949 – Childhood Memories
 1950 – Our American Heritage
 1951 – Joyful Living
 1952 – Dreams of the Future
 1953 – Melodies in Flowers
 1954 – Famous Books in Flowers
 1955 – Familiar Sayings in Flowers
 1956 – Pages From the Ages
 1957 – Famous Firsts in Flowers
 1958 – Daydreams in Flowers
 1959 – Adventures in Flowers
 1960 – Tall Tales and True
 1961 – Ballads in Blossom
 1962 – Around the World in Flowers
 1963 – Memorable Moments
 1964 – Symbols of Freedom
 1965 – Headlines in Flowers
 1966 – It's a Small World
 1967 – Travel Tales in Flowers
 1968 – Wonderful World of Adventure
 1969 – A Time to Remember
 1970 – Holidays Around the World
 1971 – Through the Eyes of a Child
 1972 – The Joy of Music
 1973 – Movie Memories
 1974 – Happiness Is ...
 1975 – Heritage of America
 1976 – America, Let's Celebrate!
 1977 – The Good Life
 1978 – On the Road to Happiness
 1979 – Our Wonderful, Wonderful World of Sports
 1980 – Music of America
 1981 – The Great Outdoors
 1982 – Friends and Neighbors
 1983 – Rejoice!
 1984 – A Salute to the Volunteer
 1985 – The Spirit of America
 1986 – A Celebration of Laughter
 1987 – A World of Wonders
 1988 – Thanks to Communications
 1989 – Celebration 100
 1990 – A World of Harmony
 1991 – Fun 'n' Games
 1992 – Voyages of Discovery
 1993 – Entertainment on Parade
 1994 – Fantastic Adventure
 1995 – SPORTS-Quest for Excellence
 1996 – Kids' Laughter & Dreams
 1997 – Life's Shining Moments
 1998 – Hav'n Fun!
 1999 – Echoes of the Century
 2000 – Celebration 2000: Visions of the Future

21st century
 2001 – Fabric of America
 2002 – Good Times
 2003 – Children's Dreams, Wishes and Imagination
 2004 – Music Music Music
 2005 – Celebrate Family
 2006 – It's Magical
 2007 – Our Good Nature
 2008 – Passport to the World's Celebrations
 2009 – Hats Off! to Entertainment
 2010 – A Cut Above the Rest
 2011 – Building Dreams, Friendships & Memories
 2012 – Just Imagine... 
 2013 – Oh, the Places You'll Go! (based on Dr. Seuss' last book Oh, the Places You'll Go!)
 2014 – Dreams Come True
 2015 – Inspiring Stories
 2016 – Find Your Adventure 
2017 – Echoes of Success 
 2018 – Making a Difference
 2019 – The Melody of Life
 2020 – The Power of Hope
 2021-22 – Dream. Believe. Achieve. (2021 parade canceled due to COVID-19)
 2023 – Turning the Corner
 2024 – Celebrating a World of Music: The Universal Language

References

Theme

See also

 List of Veiled Prophet Parade themes, St. Louis, Missouri